Mikhail Youzhny was the defending champion, but lost to Philipp Petzschner in the second round.
7th  seed Nikolay Davydenko defeated 5th seed Florian Mayer in the final 6–3, 3–6, 6–1 to win the title. It was Davydenko's first title since January 2010, and his 21st career title.

Seeds

Qualifying

Draw

Finals

Top half

Bottom half

References
Main Draw

BMW Open - Singles
2011 BMW Open